Sani Bheri is a rural municipality located in Western Rukum District of Karnali Province of Nepal.

Demographics
At the time of the 2011 Nepal census, 98.8% of the population in Sani Bheri Rural Municipality spoke Nepali and 1.1% Magar as their first language; 0.1% spoke other languages.

In terms of ethnicity/caste, 58.1% were Chhetri, 20.3% Magar, 13.1% Kami, 4.2% Damai/Dholi, 2.7% Thakuri, 0.7% Sarki, 0.6% Hill Brahmin, 0.1% Sonar and 0.2% others.

In terms of religion, 95.8% were Hindu, 2.3% Buddhist, 1.2% Prakriti, 0.6% Christian and 0.1% others.

References

External links
 Official website

Populated places in Western Rukum District
Rural municipalities in Karnali Province
Rural municipalities of Nepal established in 2017